Sorry but i call you love is a 2008 film directed by Federico Moccia and interpreted by Raoul Bova and Michela Quattrociocche. Cinematic adaptation of the Italian novel Scusa ma ti chiamo amore is published by the movie director.

The film was released on the Italian cinema circuit on January 25, 2008.

Plot
Niki is a seventeen year old girl is in her last year of high school who spends her free time with her trusted group of friends, the O.N.D.E. (waves) a name created from the first letters of each of their names : Olimpia (Olly), Nicoletta (Niki), Diletta and Erica. Alex is almost thirty-seven and a career publicist who is struggling with the loss of his longtime girlfriend, Elena, who recently left him. One morning, Niki and Alex  crash into each other while commuting. After giving her a ride to school, Alex gives Niki his contact information for any repairs needed for her moped, which soon becomes the means by which their romance blossoms. 

Diletta meets a guy at school and they quickly develop feelings for each other. Soon after making plans with him, Diletta gets into a tragic car accident that leaves her in a coma for weeks. Olly, Niki, and Erica spend their time with her in the hospital, singing and playing her songs and reviewing for la maturità, the final exam at the end of Italian high school. While Niki reviews for the test, Diletta wakes up and the girls celebrate.

Elena returns and Alex leaves Niki for his old life, but soon realizes that he is no longer in love with the woman he is supposed to be with, nor with the job he is supposed to be glad to have. Alex finds that Elena had been sleeping with the man with whom he had been competing against for the "La Luna" advertisement bid and kicks her out. He then rejects his new promotion and work and quits, buying a house on an island and leaves a note for Niki to join him there. They reunite and live happily ever after.

Cast
Raoul Bova: Alessandro Belli
Michela Quattrociocche: Niki
Veronika Logan: Elena
Luca Angeletti: Enrico
Ignazio Oliva: Flavio
Lorenzo Federici: Matteo

Sequel
A sequel entitled Scusa ma ti voglio sposare was released in 2010, with the cast from the first film reprising their roles.

References

External links

2008 films
Italian romance films
Films set in Rome
2000s Italian films